Chee Chaoming is a Malaysian table tennis player. He competed at the 2020 Summer Paralympics in Table tennis in singles C9.

References 

Living people
1997 births
People from Perak
Malaysian people of Chinese descent
Asian Games medalists in table tennis
Table tennis players at the 2020 Summer Paralympics